Beşirli Tennis Courts, aka Beşirli Tennis Complex, is a tennis venue located in Trabzon, Turkey.

Completed in 2011 at a cost of  20 million (approx. US$12.5 million), the complex consists of a center court with 4,500 seating capacity, three indoor courts, twelve outdoor courts and a children's court. There are also social and leisure facilities in addition to rooms for health care, doping test and press. The complex is the biggest of its kind in Turkey.

The Beşirli Courts hosted the tennis events during the 2011 European Youth Summer Olympic Festival.

References

External links
Plan of the Beşirli Tennis Complex at Trabzon 2011 website

Sports venues in Trabzon
Tennis venues in Turkey
Sports venues completed in 2011